The 1936 New Mexico gubernatorial election took place on November 3, 1936, in order to elect the Governor of New Mexico. Incumbent Democrat Clyde Tingley won reelection to a second term.

General election

Results

References

gubernatorial
1936
New Mexico
November 1936 events